QWOP is a 2008 ragdoll-based browser video game created by Bennett Foddy, formerly the bassist of Cut Copy. Players control an athlete named "Qwop" using only the Q, W, O, and P keys. The game became an internet meme in December 2010. The game helped Foddy's site (Foddy.net) reach 30 million hits.

Background

QWOP was created in November 2008 by Bennett Foddy for his site Foddy.net, when Foddy was a deputy director and senior research fellow of the Programme on the Ethics of the New Biosciences, The Oxford Martin School, part of the University of Oxford. He taught himself to make games while he was procrastinating from finishing his dissertation in philosophy. Foddy had been playing games ever since he got his first computer (a ZX Spectrum 48K) at age 5. Foddy stated:

Gameplay and reception

Players play as an athlete named "Qwop", who is participating in a 100-meter event at the Olympic Games. Using only the Q, W, O and P keys, players must control the movement of the athlete's legs to make the character move forward while trying to avoid falling over. The Q and W keys each drive one of the runner's thighs, while the O and P keys work the runner's calves. The Q key drives the runner's right thigh forward and left thigh backward, and the W key also affects the thighs and does the opposite. The O and P keys work in the same way as the Q and W keys, but with the runner's calves. The actual amount of movement of a joint is affected by the resistance due to forces from gravity and inertia placed upon it.

Though the objective of QWOP is simple, the game, ever since it was released, has been notorious for being difficult to master due to its controls with the Q, W, O and P keys. Foddy says that he gets a lot of hate mail for making QWOP. Despite the criticism for the game's difficulty due to the controls, the game helped Foddy's site reach 30 million hits, according to Wired, and, also ever since the game was released, has been played by millions of people, although numbers have declined.

Breakthrough and popular culture

On July 27, 2011, QWOP was featured at the Museum of Modern Art in New York City and was part of an event called "Arcade" hosted by the video game art and culture company Kill Screen.

The Guinness World Records awarded Chintamani, Karnataka resident Roshan Ramachandra for doing the fastest 100m run on the game on April 10, 2013, doing it in 51 seconds.

QWOP appeared on the season 9 premiere of the American sitcom The Office.

Alternative versions
An iPhone app of the game was released in 2011. The App version follows the same gameplay as with the original version, but the controls differ. The player controls QWOP's legs and arms by moving their thumbs around in the diamonds on the screen. Kotaku called the iPhone version "4000 Percent More Impossible" than the original game and "An Olympic Challenge For Thumbs".

A 2-player multiplayer version of QWOP named 2QWOP was also released in February 2012, after being featured at an event in Austin named "The Foddy Winter Olympics" displaying a selection of Bennett Foddy's games. This version places the game in vertical splitscreen, automatically assigning one player's thighs and calves to the Q, W, E, and R keys, while the other player uses the U, I, O, and P keys.

See also
 GIRP – a sequel to QWOP
 CLOP – another sequel
 Getting Over It with Bennett Foddy – another of Foddy's games

References

External links
 

2008 video games
Android (operating system) games
Art games
Athletics video games
Browser games
Flash games
Indie video games
IOS games
Motor skills
Noodlecake Games games
Olympic video games
Online games
Parody video games
Single-player video games
Video game memes
Video games developed in the United Kingdom